Yerram Venkata Subba Reddy is an Indian politician who served as the member of parliament to the 16th Lok Sabha from Ongole (Lok Sabha constituency), Andhra Pradesh. He won the 2014 Indian general election being a Yuvajana Sramika Rythu Congress Party candidate.
In 2019, he has been appointed as the Chairman of Tirumala Tirupati Devasthanams, which is equivalent to Minister rank in Andhra Pradesh Government.

Born in Medarametla, in Prakasam District to Yerram Chinna Poli Reddy and Yerram Pitchamma, he is married to Ms. Swarnalatha Reddy, the younger sister of Ms Y. S. Vijayamma (Mother of Y. S. Jaganmohan Reddy).

General Elections 2014

References

India MPs 2014–2019
Living people
YSR Congress Party politicians
Lok Sabha members from Andhra Pradesh
People from Ongole
Telugu politicians
1960 births